Theodore Townson Churton was an Anglican priest in the early  20th century.

He was born into an ecclesiastical family on 24 April 1853 and educated at New College, Oxford. He was ordained in 1883 and was Curate of Holy Trinity, Hastings until his appointment to his father's old parish at Icklesham in 1891.  He was Archdeacon of Lewes from 1908 to 1912 and then of Hastings until his death on 1 June 1915.

Notes

1853 births
Alumni of New College, Oxford
Archdeacons of Lewes
Archdeacons of Hastings
1915 deaths
People from Icklesham